Mallosia baiocchii is a species of beetle in the family Cerambycidae. It was described by Sama in 2000. It is known from Syria.

References

Saperdini
Beetles described in 2000